Andreas Keller (born 1 October 1965) is a former field hockey player from West Germany, who competed at three Summer Olympics for his native country. He won the gold medal with Germany at the 1992 Summer Olympics in Barcelona, after securing silver at the two previous Olympics in Los Angeles (1984) and Seoul (1988), with West Germany.

The former striker and goalgetter is related to German female hockey star Natascha Keller, who won the gold medal at the 2004 Summer Olympics; he is her older brother. Their younger brother Florian Keller won hockey gold at the 2008 Summer Olympics. Their father Carsten for his sake captured the gold medal in field hockey at the 1972 Summer Olympics in Munich, while their grandfather Erwin won a silver medal in the same sport at the 1936 Summer Olympics in Berlin.

Andreas Keller was temporarily allied with the hockey silver medalist Anke Wild, who is also the mother of his two older children Felix and Luca.

References

External links
 

1965 births
Living people
German male field hockey players
Olympic field hockey players of Germany
Olympic field hockey players of West Germany
Field hockey players at the 1984 Summer Olympics
Field hockey players at the 1988 Summer Olympics
Field hockey players at the 1992 Summer Olympics
Olympic gold medalists for Germany
Olympic silver medalists for West Germany
Field hockey players from Berlin
Olympic medalists in field hockey
Medalists at the 1992 Summer Olympics
Medalists at the 1988 Summer Olympics
Medalists at the 1984 Summer Olympics